The 2006 UNAF U-20 Tournament was the 2nd edition of the UNAF U-20 Tournament. The tournament took place in Egypt, from 5 to 14 June 2006. Egypt won the tournament for the first time.

Participants

 (hosts)

Tournament

Champion

References

2006 in African football
UNAF U-20 Tournament
UNAF U-20 Tournament